Five ships of the French Navy have borne the name Dauphin Royal in honour of the Dauphin of France:

Ships named Dauphin Royal 
 Dauphin Royal (1664), a 12-gun fluyt better known as Éléphant
 , a 110-gun ship of the line that fought at Beachy Head 
 , a 74-gun ship of the line that fought at Quiberon Bay and Ushant 
 Dauphin Royal (1791), a 118-gun ship of the line (launched 1791 at Toulon), renamed Sans Culotte in September 1792 and then Orient in May 1795 - flagship of the French fleet at the Battle of the Nile
 , a 90-gun , was originally Brianée and then Dauphin Royal before being renamed in 1830 during construction; she was not launched until 1853

See also

Notes and references

Notes

References

Bibliography 
 

French Navy ship names